Eteobalea tririvella is a moth in the  family Cosmopterigidae. It is found in France, Italy, Austria, the Czech Republic, Slovakia, Hungary, Croatia, Romania, Moldova, Ukraine, Russia, Mongolia, Latvia, Estonia, Finland and Sweden.

The wingspan is 11–17 mm. The forewings are black with three shining golden lines and an apical patch. The hindwings are greyish black. Adults are on wing from mid-June to the end of August.

The larvae possibly feed on Thymus species.

References

Moths described in 1870
Eteobalea
Moths of Europe